Hubbard is a city in Hill County, Texas, United States. It was named for Texas Governor Richard B. Hubbard. The population was 1,423 at the 2010 census, down from 1,586 at the 2000 census.

History
Hubbard was named after Richard B. Hubbard, the 16th governor of Texas. He was on hand at the sales of the first town lots on August 11, 1881. The city was organized when the railroads were built through this section of the state. Its first bank was organized in 1881. In 1895 mineral water was discovered in Hubbard. This spawned several bath houses and a sanitarium. Hubbard's reputation as a health resort contributed to its population increase. On March 10, 1973, an F4 tornado destroyed about a third of Hubbard, including half of the business district, killing six people and injuring 77.

Geography

Hubbard is located in southeastern Hill County at  (31.847593, –96.797352). Texas State Highway 31 passes through the center of town, leading northeast  to Corsicana and southwest  to Waco. State Highway 171 crosses Highway 31 in the center of Hubbard, leading northwest  to Hillsboro, the Hill county seat, and southeast  to Mexia.

Demographics

2020 census

As of the 2020 United States census, there were 1,394 people, 553 households, and 369 families residing in the city.

2000 census
As of the census of 2000, there were 1,586 people, 625 households, and 406 families residing in the city. The population density was 800.8 people per square mile (309.3/km2). There were 715 housing units at an average density of 361.0/sq mi (139.4/km2). The racial makeup of the city was 74.46% White, 20.81% African American, 0.25% Native American, 0.19% Asian, 1.39% from other races, and 2.90% from two or more races. Hispanic or Latino of any race were 3.97% of the population.

There were 625 households, out of which 30.9% had children under the age of 18 living with them, 44.6% were married couples living together, 17.1% had a female householder with no husband present, and 35.0% were non-families. 32.0% of all households were made up of individuals, and 20.0% had someone living alone who was 65 years of age or older. The average household size was 2.42 and the average family size was 3.10.

In the city, the population was spread out, with 27.5% under the age of 18, 6.8% from 18 to 24, 24.0% from 25 to 44, 19.9% from 45 to 64, and 21.9% who were 65 years of age or older. The median age was 39 years. For every 100 females, there were 78.4 males. For every 100 females age 18 and over, there were 73.7 males.

The median income for a household in the city was $25,950, and the median income for a family was $34,083. Males had a median income of $30,795 versus $16,696 for females. The per capita income for the city was $15,311. About 20.4% of families and 24.5% of the population were below the poverty line, including 36.7% of those under age 18 and 15.1% of those age 65 or over.

Photo gallery

Education
The city is served by the Hubbard Independent School District.

Notable people
 Mark English, illustrator and painter
 Samuel D. Johnson, Jr., federal judge
 J. Frank Norris, fundamentalist Baptist pastor
 Ron Shanklin, NFL player
 Tris Speaker, baseball Hall of Famer

See also

 List of cities in Texas

References

External links

 

Cities in Texas
Cities in Hill County, Texas